Phai Kho Don is a sub-district in the Mueang Phitsanulok District of Phitsanulok Province, Thailand.

Geography
Phai Kho Don lies in the Nan Basin, which is part of the Chao Phraya Watershed.

Mubans
All six mubans (numbered 1 through 6) correspond to the single settlement of Ban Phai Kho Don.

Temples
Wat Suwan Pradit
Wat Luang Pho Daeng

References

Tambon of Phitsanulok province
Populated places in Phitsanulok province